Group C of the 2017 Africa Cup of Nations qualification tournament was one of the thirteen groups to decide the teams which qualified for the 2017 Africa Cup of Nations finals tournament. The group consisted of four teams: Mali, Equatorial Guinea, Benin, and South Sudan.

The teams played against each other home-and-away in a round-robin format, between June 2015 and September 2016.

Mali, the group winners, qualified for the 2017 Africa Cup of Nations.

Standings

Matches

Goalscorers
5 goals

 Stéphane Sessègnon

3 goals

 Abdoulay Diaby

2 goals

 Frédéric Gounongbe
 Emilio Nsue
 Moussa Doumbia
 Modibo Maïga

1 goal

 Khaled Adénon
 David Djigla
 Jodel Dossou
 Steve Mounié
 Mickaël Poté
 Carlos Akapo
 Josete Miranda
 Randy
 Iván Zarandona
 Salif Coulibaly
 Moussa Marega
 Adama Traoré
 Molla Wagué
 Mustapha Yatabaré
 Sambou Yatabaré
 Chol Peter Bentiu
 Sebit Bruno
 Atak Lual

Notes

References

External links
Orange Africa Cup Of Nations Qualifiers 2017, CAFonline.com

Group C